Hokendauqua is an unincorporated community and census-designated place (CDP) in Whitehall Township in Lehigh County, Pennsylvania. The population of Hokendauqua was 3,340 as of the 2020 census. Hokendauqua is a suburb of Allentown, Pennsylvania in the Lehigh Valley metropolitan area, which had a population of 861,899 and was the 68th most populous metropolitan area in the U.S. as of the 2020 census.

The word Hokendauqua is shortened to "Hokey" (pronounced  "hockey") in local dialect. It uses the Whitehall ZIP code of 18052.

Geography
Hokendauqua is located in northeastern Lehigh County at  (40.647895, -75.481828), on the east side of Whitehall Township. The borough of Coplay is directly to the north. To the northwest is the census-designated place, Stiles, and the village of West Catasauqua is directly to the south. The borough of North Catasauqua is to the east across the Lehigh River in Northampton County; a bridge connects Hokendauqua to North Catasauqua. Pennsylvania Route 145 (MacArthur Road) forms the western edge of Hokendauqua; the highway leads south  to the center of Allentown and north  to Walnutport.

It is drained by the Lehigh River and its tributary Coplay Creek, which flows through the southwestern part of the community.

Demographics

As of the 2000 census, there were 3,411 people, 1,407 households, and 970 families residing in the CDP. The population density was 3,095.5 people per square mile (1,197.3/km). There were 1,444 housing units at an average density of 1,310.4/sq mi (506.8/km). The racial makeup of the CDP was 96.16% White, 1.76% African American, 0.18% Native American, 0.85% Asian, 0.03% Pacific Islander, 0.50% from other races, and 0.53% from two or more races. Hispanic or Latino of any race were 2.08% of the population.

There were 1,407 households, out of which 27.3% had children under the age of 18 living with them, 57.6% were married couples living together, 8.1% had a female householder with no husband present, and 31.0% were non-families. 26.7% of all households were made up of individuals, and 13.8% had someone living alone who was 65 years of age or older. The average household size was 2.42 and the average family size was 2.95.

The population in Hokendauqua was spread out with 21.0% under the age of 18, 7.3% from 18 to 24, 26.2% from 25 to 44, 26.5% from 45 to 64, and 19.0% who were 65 years of age or older. The median age was 42 years. For every 100 females, there were 92.7 males. For every 100 females age 18 and over, there were 88.7 males. The median income for a household in the CDP was $39,333, and the median income for a family was $55,256. Males had a median income of $37,500 versus $26,227 for females. The per capita income for the CDP was $19,771. About 4.0% of families and 4.9% of the population were below the poverty line, including 2.6% of those under age 18 and 12.0% of those age 65 or over.

Public education
The community is served by the Whitehall-Coplay School District. Students in grades nine through 12 attend Whitehall High School.

Notable residents
Joe Antolick, former professional baseball player, Philadelphia Phillies
Thomas J. Lynch, World War II flying ace
Matt Millen, former professional football player, Oakland Raiders, San Francisco 49ers and Washington Redskins and former President and General Manager, Detroit Lions

References

External links

Census-designated places in Lehigh County, Pennsylvania
Census-designated places in Pennsylvania